Mariela González Torres (born 5 April 1974) is a female marathon runner from Cuba, who won the gold medal in the women's marathon at the 2007 Pan American Games. She represented her native country at the 2004 Summer Olympics in Athens, Greece, finishing in 59th place.

Career
She won the 2000 edition of the Havana International Marathon and went on to take the half marathon gold medal at the 2001 Central American and Caribbean Championships in Athletics. She won the Madrid Marathon twice consecutively in 2001 and 2002. She took the silver medal in the marathon at the 2003 Pan American Games, finishing behind Márcia Narloch of Brazil. She set a championship record of 2:36.51 at the second National Cuban Olympics. With the half marathon removed from the programme, she entered the 10,000 metres at the 2005 CAC Championships and was the runner-up behind compatriot Yudelkis Martínez.

Personal best
3000 m: 9:38.8 min (ht) –  La Habana, 16 April 1997
5000 m: 16:12.63 min –  La Habana, 10 March 2002
10,000 m: 33:48.33 min –  La Habana, 8 March 2002
Half marathon: 1:14:16 hrs –  La Habana, 17 February 2007
Marathon: 2:36:52 hrs –  La Habana, 18 April 2004

Achievements

References

External links
 
 
 Tilastopaja biography

1974 births
Living people
Cuban female long-distance runners
Cuban female marathon runners
Athletes (track and field) at the 2004 Summer Olympics
Olympic athletes of Cuba
Athletes (track and field) at the 1999 Pan American Games
Athletes (track and field) at the 2003 Pan American Games
Athletes (track and field) at the 2007 Pan American Games
Pan American Games medalists in athletics (track and field)
Pan American Games gold medalists for Cuba
Pan American Games silver medalists for Cuba
Medalists at the 2003 Pan American Games
Medalists at the 2007 Pan American Games
People from Granma Province